Kazuya Fukuura (福浦 和也, born December 14, 1975) is a Japanese professional baseball first baseman for the Chiba Lotte Marines in Japan's Nippon Professional Baseball. He began his career as a pitcher.

His play and build drew comparisons to former Chicago Cub Mark Grace.

External links

NPB

1975 births
Living people
People from Narashino
Baseball people from Chiba Prefecture
Chiba Lotte Marines players
Japanese baseball players
Nippon Professional Baseball designated hitters
Nippon Professional Baseball first basemen
Japanese baseball coaches
Nippon Professional Baseball coaches